Touk Miller (rhymes with "Luke"; born 22 February 1996) is a professional Australian rules footballer playing for the Gold Coast Suns in the Australian Football League (AFL). Miller plays as a midfielder and was drafted to the Suns as the 29th overall pick in the 2014 AFL draft.

Early life
Miller was born in Melbourne to an African-American father and an Australian mother of Jamaican and English  descent. His father, Wylie, is an Ohio-born frontman-singer in the legendary soul band, Grand WaZoo, and a bass guitar soloist, and his mother, Ruth, is a veteran marathon runner and triathlete. Touk started high school in the selective sports academy at Maribyrnong College. He then accepted a scholarship to St Kevin's College for both his football and cricket talents. Miller was selected to represent the under 15 Victorian state cricket team at the national championships in March 2011 and made his first XI debut for the North Melbourne Cricket Club at the Junction Oval in December 2011 before electing to focus on football the following year.

Junior career
Miller played all of his junior years with the Maribyrnong Park Lions in the Essendon District Football League and made his senior debut for the club in 2011 at the age of 15. He played junior football for both St Kevin's College in the APS football competition and the Calder Cannons in the TAC Cup. He also captained both the Cannons and the Vic Metro Under 18 team in the 2014 AFL Under 18 Championships.

AFL career
Miller made his debut for the Suns in round 1 of the 2015 season. Miller earned a rising star nomination in round 16 of that year where he had 27 disposals and two goals against the Greater Western Sydney Giants. In May of 2015, Touk re-signed to the Suns, keeping him contracted to the club until 2017.

Miller was promoted to the Gold Coast vice-captaincy at the beginning of 2019. He played his 100th AFL game in Round 23 against Greater Western Sydney. Despite missing several matches through injury, Miller finished 6th in Gold Coast's 2019 best and fairest count. In May 2021, Miller was handed a one-match ban for rough conduct against St Kilda player Nick Coffield. At the end of the 2021 season, Miller was in the All-Australian team and won the Gold Coast Suns best and fairest 

Miller was appointed Gold Coast co-captain for the 2022 season.

Following the 2022 AFL season, Miller was named All Australian, Gold Coast's Club Champion and the AFLCA MVP.

Statistics
Updated to the end of 2022.

|-
| scope=row | 2015 ||  || 44
| 22 || 7 || 8 || 184 || 190 || 374 || 51 || 111 || 0.3 || 0.4 || 8.4 || 8.6 || 17.0 || 2.3 || 5.1 || 0
|-
| scope=row | 2016 ||  || 11
| 18 || 4 || 6 || 174 || 211 || 385 || 51 || 88 || 0.2 || 0.3 || 9.7 || 11.7 || 21.4 || 2.8 || 4.9 || 2
|-
| scope=row | 2017 ||  || 11
| 20 || 7 || 6 || 135 || 282 || 417 || 67 || 90 || 0.4 || 0.3 || 6.8 || 14.1 || 20.9 || 3.4 || 4.5 || 0
|-
| scope=row | 2018 ||  || 11
| 22 || 6 || 7 || 198 || 287 || 485 || 77 || 123 || 0.3 || 0.3 || 9.0 || 13.1 || 22.1 || 3.5 || 5.6 || 4
|-
| scope=row | 2019 ||  || 11
| 18 || 4 || 3 || 183 || 219 || 402 || 81 || 103 || 0.2 || 0.2 || 10.2 || 12.2 || 22.3 || 4.5 || 5.7 || 5
|-
| scope=row | 2020 ||  || 11
| 17 || 3 || 4 || 117 || 163 || 340 || 50 || 88 || 0.2|| 0.2 || 10.4 || 9.6 || 20.0 || 2.9 || 5.2 || 3
|-
| scope=row | 2021 ||  || 11
| 21 || 8 || 8 || 334 || 334 || 668 || 95 || 149 || 0.4 || 0.4 || 15.9 || 15.9 || 31.8 || 4.4 || 7.1 || 17
|-
| scope=row | 2022 ||  || 11
| 22 || 8 || 11 || 373 || 253 || 626 || 83 || 133 || 0.4 || 0.5 || 17.0 || 11.5 || 28.5 || 3.8 || 6.0 || 27
|- class=sortbottom
! colspan=3 | Career
! 160 !! 47 !! 53 !! 1758 !! 1939 !! 3697 !! 555 !! 885 !! 0.3 !! 0.3 !! 11.0 !! 12.1 !! 23.1 !! 3.5 !! 5.5 !! 58
|}

Notes

Honours and achievements
Individual
 AFLCA Champion Player of the Year Award: 2022
 Gold Coast Suns Club Champion: 2021
 2× All-Australian team: 2021, 2022
 Gold Coast captain: 2022–
 3× Marcus Ashcroft Medal: 2016, 2018, 2022
 AFL Rising Star nominee: 2015 (round 16)
 Scoops Medal 2022 (32 votes)

References

External links

1996 births
Living people
Gold Coast Football Club players
Calder Cannons players
Australian rules footballers from Melbourne
Australian people of African-American descent
Australian people of English descent
Australian people of Jamaican descent
People educated at St Kevin's College, Melbourne